Ion Suruceanu (born 9 September 1949) is a Moldovan singer and former parliamentarian. In 1990 he was awarded the People's Artist award of Moldavian SSR.

Brief background 

Ion Suruceanu was born in the village of Suruceni, Ialoveni District, of Moldova.

He started his singing career in 1968 as a solo singer in the ensemble "Noroc" where he sang until 1970. In 1978-79 Suruceanu sang for the ensemble "Bucuria". In 1981, he finished the Chişinău Music school where he learned to play bassoon and piano.

From the mid 80s Suruceanu became one of Moldova's most famous singers whose fame spread outside the republic. He also performed Russian language songs such as "Nezabudka" (Forget-me-not) which Suruceanu sang at the final of Song of the Year festival in 1989. During this period 1986-1993, he was also performing with the group "Real". Since 1982, his constant composer was Ian Raiburg.

From 1994 to 1998, Suruceanu was a parliamentarian in the Moldovan parliament where he was a deputy chairman of the committee for culture, science, education, and media. He lives in Chişinău.

Works

Song performance
 Vinyl
În Moldova mea frumoasă (composer A. Luxemburg — Text G. Miron)
Băieţii veseli (composer A. Luxemburg — Text S.Ghimpu)
 Un singur cantec stiu (I have but one song, 1986) 
 Soarele cel mare (Big sun, 1987)
 Compact discs
 Ninge floarea de tei (2002)
 Twenty years later: songs of Ian Rainburg (2003)
 Roze, roze (2004)
 Others
 "Nezabudka"
 O melodie de amor 
 Septembrie
 Guleai, guleai
 Nostalgia
 Adriatica
 Un, doi, trei
 Odinocestvo
 Fetele-cochetele
 Luna, luna
 Drumurile noastre
 Ce seară minunată
 Films
 Dnestrovskiye melodiy

References

External links 

 Official youtube channel
 Tu si eu
 Sfatul Meu
 Discography, mp3, texts of songs at www.music.md
 «Ce seară minunată»
 Video "What should I do"

1949 births
Living people
People from Ialoveni District
Communist Party of the Soviet Union members
Moldovan communists
Soviet male singers
20th-century Moldovan male singers
Members of the parliament of Moldova
Moldovan MPs 1994–1998